Alla Yakovlevna Ioshpe (Yoshpe) (13 June 1937 – 30 January 2021) was a Soviet and Russian pop singer, and a People's Artist of the Russian Federation (2002).

Biography 
Yoshpe was born in Moscow into a Jewish family. She studied philosophy at Moscow State University and while a student sang with the university's symphony orchestra.

In 1960, at a university event, she met Stakhan Rakhimov and the pair formed a pop duo. The pair performed both in the Soviet Union and overseas.

Selected songs 
 'Tri plus pyat' (lit. 'Three plus five'), Russian-language cover of Marie Laforêt's 'Ivan, Boris et moi'

References

External links 
 Алла Йошпе и Стахан Рахимов  

1937 births
2021 deaths
Soviet women singers
Russian Jews
People's Artists of Russia
Honored Artists of the Russian Federation
Soviet Jews
20th-century Russian women singers
21st-century Russian women singers
20th-century Russian singers
21st-century Russian singers
Moscow State University alumni
Singers from Moscow